John Peirce  (August 16, 1836 – March 3, 1897) was an American professor of chemistry, a scientist and an inventor. He participated in the development of the telephone.

Biography 
Peirce was born in Providence, Rhode Island, on August 16, 1836; his father died before he was born. His mother remarried to Seth Padelford, the governor of Rhode Island. Peirce lived with his family in Providence and received his education at the Brown University Grammar School. He graduated in 1856 and worked for a drug company until the poor economic conditions caused by the Panic of 1857 caused him to leave and go with his family to Europe for a year.

Although Peirce read law with Abraham Payne in 1859, he never went into practice. He was appointed assistant professor of chemistry in 1862 at Brown University and was promoted to full professorship in 1863. Two years later he resigned and devoted himself to research in chemistry  at Harvard University and then Yale University.

Peirce took care of his personal estate after leaving the universities. He was wealthy and pursued hobbies and studies in his fields of interest, including electricity, photography, and the Aeolian harp.

He died on March 3, 1897, in Providence.

References

External links

1836 births
1897 deaths
People from Providence, Rhode Island
19th-century American inventors
Brown University alumni
Brown University faculty